École d'Application is a school in Nouakchott, Mauritania. It is adjacent (south) to the Lycée de Garçons Nouakchott, sandwiched between that and the Stade de la Capitale.

See also

 Education in Mauritania
 Lists of schools

References

Educational institutions with year of establishment missing
Nouakchott
Schools in Mauritania